A high beam is a type of automobile headlight.

High beam may also refer to:
 Killer in the backseat, an urban legend
 HighBeam Research, a defunct Internet search engine